A monocopter or gyropter is a rotorcraft that uses a single rotating blade. The concept is similar to the whirling helicopter seeds that fall from some trees. The name gyropter is sometimes applied to monocopters in which the entire aircraft rotates about its center of mass as it flies. The name "monocopter" has also been applied to the personal jet pack constructed by Andreas Petzoldt.

History

Papin-Rouilly 

The Gyroptère was designed in 1913–1914 by Alphonse Papin and Didier Rouilly in France, inspired by a maple seed.<ref>{{cite journal | last = Meyer | first = H. | title = Een Nieuw Vliegtuig, De Gyroptère van Papin & Rouilly | trans-title=  | journal = Kampioen | issue = XXXIe jaargang, n° 30, Technisch Bijblad, 8e jaargang, No.30 []| publisher = ANWB | location = The Hague | date =  12 June 1914 | url = https://books.google.com/books?id=Z6-ZKwCiZ3MC&pg=RA1-PA191 | language= nl | pages= 185–187| access-date= January 25, 2022}}</ref> Papin and Rouilly obtained French patents 440,593 and 440,594 for their invention, and later obtained US patent 1,133,660 in 1915. The Gyroptère was characterized in the contemporary French journal La Nature in 1914 as "" (a giant boomerang). Following demonstrations of small rocket-powered models, the Army ordered a manned prototype in 1913.

Papin and Rouilly's "Gyroptère" weighed  including the float on which it was mounted. Directional control was to be achieved by means of a small auxiliary tube through which some of the air was driven and which could be directed in whatever direction the pilot wished. The pilot's position was located at the centre of gravity between the blade and the fan.

Testing was delayed due to the outbreak of World War I and did not take place until 31 March 1915 on Lake Cercey on the Côte-d'Or. Due to the difficulty of balancing the craft, a rotor speed of only 47 rpm was achieved instead of the 60 rpm which had been calculated as necessary for takeoff. In addition, the rotary engine used was not powerful enough; it had originally been planned to use a 100 hp car engine, which proved unobtainable. Unfortunately, the aircraft became unstable and the pilot had to abandon it, after which it sank.

Sikorsky XV-2

The Sikorsky XV-2, also known by the Sikorsky Aircraft model number S-57, was a planned experimental stoppable rotor aircraft that was developed for a joint research program between the United States Air Force and the United States Army. The design utilized a single-rotor design: a counterweight provided stability to the rotor system, while a tip-jet arrangement powered the rotor, which was to be retracted into the upper fuselage when stopped, with the XV-2 then flying like a conventional aircraft on delta wings. A single jet engine was to be provided for forward flight. The program was cancelled before construction of the prototype began.

Bölkow Bo 103

The Bölkow Bo 103 was an ultralight helicopter designed for reconnaissance and command-control purposes and constructed by Bölkow Entwicklungen KG in 1961 as part of a research order by the German Federal Ministry of Defense. It had a  diameter monoblade rotor constructed of GRP in a single piece that incorporated its counterweight. A single prototype was built, but work was stopped in 1962 due to lack of interest on the part of the West German armed forces.

VJ-1X
The VJ-1X was an ultralight single blade helicopter powered by a rotor-mounted pulsejet. Windspire, Inc. include the plans for sale in their book How to Build a Jet Helicopter.

UAVs

Monocopters, in which the entire aircraft rotates about its center of mass as it flies, present advantages and challenges as unmanned aerial vehicles (UAVs) to the designer. As highly centripetal machines, they cannot be manned.

The first of these monocopters were constructed by Dr. Charles W. McCutchen and powered by reciprocating model airplane engines in 1952. He flew them at Lake Placid and named them "Charybdis machines". Other early experimenters were William Foshag and Joe Carter.

These types of monocopters caught on in the model airplane world, particularly in Eastern Europe, where free flight record-setting models were constructed by George Horvath of Hungary, Sergei Vorabyev  and V. Naidovsky of Russia, and Steffan Purice of Romania. An exception to the lack of US enthusiasm was Francis Boreham's "Buzzcopter" of 1964 and Ken Willard's "Rotoriser" of 1984. In 2002, Ron Jesme made the first successful electric propeller monocopter.  Daedalus Research of Logan Utah also manufactured a monocopter kit, "Maple Seed," using a 0.049 model-airplane engine.

Gordon Mandell of the M.I.T. Model Rocket Society designed a model-rocket engine powered monocopter, which he named "turbocopter," and published the design concept in his column "Wayward Wind" in Model Rocketry Magazine in 1969.  A later version of this was researched at MIT in 1980.  This design prompted Korey Kline, an early member of the Tripoli Rocketry Association, to design his own rocket-powered monocopters which fly on long-burn model rocket engines.  They were demonstrated at various rocket launch events in the 1980s to crowds that raved at their performance.  A few were manufactured as kits by Ace Rocketry at that time.

Korey Kline published very little about monocopters, rocket or otherwise, and so by the 1990s the monocopter had faded from view.  Edward Miller of Pennsylvania began experimenting with them again in the late 1990s, as well as Francis Graham, a Kent State University, Ohio, physics professor. By 1999 both were flying rocket monocopters.  Francis Graham wrote a book, Monocopters'',  with some theory of their flight characteristics, in 1999, sold by Apogee Components of Colorado Springs. Ed Miller went on to build the largest high power rocket monocopters ever flown, with 8 foot large fiberglass-covered wooden  wings, and also sells them. Chuck Rudy flew a large monocopter with a hybrid rocket engine, using solid and liquid fuel. 
Francis Graham continued to promote monocopters and organized a small conference held in Washington, Pennsylvania, in 2001.  He also presented a paper on the subject at the 2003 Century-of-Flight conference sponsored by the AIAA in Dayton.

Joseph Peklicz of Martin's Ferry scaled down the monocopter into a kit form using small model rocket engines and sold many to individuals and schools. His kits are still available and widely sold.  In 2008, Art Applewhite of Kerrville, Texas, began selling a popular line of rocket-powered monocopter kits as well.

Monocopters that rotate entirely had no practical purpose prior to 2003, but, due in part to Graham's book, that would change. Patent 7,104,862 was awarded in 2006 to Michael A. Dammar of Vera-Tech Aero RPV Corp. of Edina, Minnesota, for a monocopter military reconnaissance device that was remotely controlled and took short exposures. Another remote-controlled monocopter, which could fly indoors on an electric motor, and which uses the Earth's magnetic field as a reference, was developed by Woody Hoburg and James Houghton at MIT in 2007–2008.

See also
 Tip jet

Notes
Citations

Bibliography

Helicopters
Aircraft configurations